Newport is an unincorporated community in Charles County, Maryland, United States. Sarum was listed on the National Register of Historic Places in 1974. St. Mary's Roman Catholic Church is a historic Roman Catholic church listed on the National Register of Historic Places in 1991.

References

Unincorporated communities in Charles County, Maryland
Unincorporated communities in Maryland